The Witches, released in the United States as The Devil's Own, is a 1966 British horror film directed by Cyril Frankel and starring Joan Fontaine, Alec McCowen, Kay Walsh, Ann Bell, Ingrid Boulting (billed as Ingrid Brett) and Gwen Ffrangcon Davies. Made by Hammer Films, it was adapted by Nigel Kneale from the 1960 novel The Devil's Own by Norah Lofts, published under the pseudonym Peter Curtis.

Plot
Schoolteacher Gwen Mayfield comes back to England after suffering a nervous breakdown caused by an attack by witch-doctors while working in a mission in Africa. She's hired by the wealthy Reverend Alan Bax, who runs a school in the remote village of Heddaby. Once there, Gwen finds out Alan is not actually a minister, and only wears a collar out of "a sense of security"; the only church in the village is in ruins. Meanwhile, she befriends Alan's sister, an esteemed journalist.

The romance between two of Gwen's students, Ronnie Dowsett and Linda Rigg, is sternly opposed by adults in the village for reasons Gwen can't understand. Linda lives with her grandmother, who's rumoured to be a witch and Ronnie fears is abusing Linda.

As Ronnie is a gifted student, Alan proposes to pay for his stay at a prep school outside the village, but the boy's father is against it. Gwen volunteers to tutor the boy.
Ronnie gives Linda a male doll as a mate to her female one, to represent them as a couple. The next day, Ronnie falls into a coma, and Gwen finds the male doll with pins stuck through it and its head missing. She shows it to Stephanie, who indicates someone might be dabbling in witchcraft. Impressed by Gwen's knowledge of magical practices in Africa, Stephanie invites her to coauthor an article about witchcraft in contemporary England.

Ronnie's superstitious mother becomes upset when Gwen asks her about Ronnie's state. Later, she goes to Granny Rigg's house to work out a deal. The next day, Ronnie is out of the coma and is quickly taken by his mother to stay with her relatives in Wales. Ronnie's father confronts Granny Rigg about it and is later found drowned in a nearby pond.

Gwen starts to think people who believe themselves to be witches are behind these incidents, and realizes that if they're trying to keep Ronnie apart from Linda, it could mean they might be planning to sacrifice her as a virgin. She announces her will to testify at the inquest into Ronnie's father's death. Following an injury caused by Stephanie's dogs, Gwen is taken to the Baxes' home where she is treated by the local doctor. During the night, she gets frightened by the sudden appearance of an African totem, and suffers another nervous breakdown.

Months later, Gwen is recovering in a nursing home with no recollection of ever leaving Africa. After a visiting little girl's doll triggers the return of her memories, she escapes the hospital and hitchhikes back to Heddaby, where she's welcomed to stay at the Baxes' again. One of the villagers whispers to her that Linda, officially in vacation at her cousin's, has actually been taken by the witches.

One night, Gwen sees from the Baxes' window a group of people scurrying toward the ruined church, and goes to investigate, finding a witches' coven led by Stephanie, who reveals she had planned to initiate Gwen into their ranks. Stephanie explains that she has learned a ritual that extends life through the ritual sacrifice of a pure maiden, planned for the next night, in occasion of Lammastide. The place of sacrifice is to be kept spiritually clean or the power of the ritual will turn upon the witch. Unable to find where they are hiding Linda, Gwen waits for the ceremony. Linda is there but in a trance, unable to assist in her own rescue. As Stephanie raises the ritual knife to kill the girl, Gwen cuts herself and smears her blood on Stephanie's robe, defiling it. Seized with convulsions, Stephanie tries to remove her soiled garb, but falls dead.

Weeks later, freed of Stephanie's influence, Heddaby has returned to normal. Gwen chooses to stay and work as a schoolteacher for Alan.

Cast

Production

The village of Hambleden, Buckinghamshire, was the filming location for the fictional village of Heddaby. Interiors were filmed at Hammer's usual studio at Bray in the same year that the famous horror film company vacated their home altogether for (mainly) Elstree and Pinewood. The cast featured child-actor Martin Stephens, then 17. The supporting cast also included Hammer regular Duncan Lamont, as well as John Collin, Michele Dotrice, Leonard Rossiter and Bryan Marshall. The score was by Richard Rodney Bennett.

Critical reception

Variety called the film "routine entertainment". The Hammer Story: The Authorised Biography of Hammer Films called the film "unsettling, though compromised by a hysterical climax", writing, "when The Witches strikes the right balance it ultimately succeeds as an engrossing thriller, even if it ultimately disappoints as Hammer horror."

References

Sources

External links
 
 
 

1966 horror films
1960s fantasy films
1966 films
Films based on British novels
Films scored by Richard Rodney Bennett
Hammer Film Productions horror films
Films about witchcraft
20th Century Fox films
Films directed by Cyril Frankel
1960s English-language films
1960s British films